Oklahoma City 1889 Football Club is an American men's soccer club based in Oklahoma City, Oklahoma. The club is a member of the National Premier Soccer League (NPSL), a semi-professional soccer league in US Soccer that includes qualification for and participation in the US Open Cup. The club is formerly a member of the UPSL.

History 
The club's founding season in 2017 consisted of a summer schedule of friendlies only where the team competed under the name "OKC Fighting Imps" due to complications with joining a league.

In the 2018 regular season, they finished 3rd in the UPSL Central Conference North Division and missed playoffs by one spot behind Dallas Elite FC and champions Inocentes FC.

In the 2019 regular season, they finished 2nd in the UPSL Central Conference Pro-Premier (1st tier) North Division behind Inocentes FC and qualified for Central Conference playoffs. The Central Conference playoff run includes a 3–1 victory against Reign FK, a 3–1 victory against FC Waco, a 2–0 victory against Matias Almeyda FC, and was capped off when Imps won the Central Conference championship 2–1 in extra time against Inocentes FC. The season ended with a 4–0 loss to Southwest FC in El Paso in the UPSL National Quarterfinal. Niall Burley was selected to the UPSL Best XI Second Team for the Spring season.

The 2020 season was postponed due to the outbreak of COVID-19. The Imps did compete virtually instead in the 2020 Lower League eCup, a competition that took place online in FIFA 20 between 120+ third tier or lower teams in the United States. OKC 1889 FC was represented in the Xbox One tournament by Twitter user @LFC_RJ who made it through the group stage and on to the Round of 32 where he lost to FC Tucson by an aggregate of 4–1 over two legs.

The Imps announced on March 24, 2021, that they will compete in Heartland Conference of the NPSL South Region for the 2021 season. They finished third in the 2021 regular season behind Tulsa Athletic and champions Demize NPSL, and qualified for the Heartland playoffs. The  2021 playoff run includes a loss to Tulsa Athletic 5–4 in penalties after the match finished 2–2 after extra time. Callum Shepherd earned NPSL Team of the month honors in May. Fabian Forisch and Muhammad Bilal were selected on the NPSL Heartland Conference XI team. Bilal was also selected to the South Region XI.

On March 16, 2022, the Imps announced that Niall Burley would transition from being a player on the squad to being the manager of the club. The 2022 Heartland Conference regular season ended with the Imps in 2nd place behind Tulsa Athletic which qualified them for the Heartland playoffs.  This was the first season that the second ever manager of the club, Niall Burley, was at the helm. Burley led the team to the most successful regular season campaign in club history by winning 8 out of 12 matches. The 2022 playoff run included a 4–2 home win against Sunflower State FC. The Imps ultimately lost in the Heartland Conference final to Tulsa Athletic 5–1.

Before the 2023 season, the NPSL announced that the Heartland Conference was moved to the Midwest Region.

Rivalries

Purple Reign derby 
Rivalry with Reign FK in Bartlesville, Oklahoma.

 Record: 5-2-0 [W-D-L]; 19 GF-5 GA

War for I-44 
Rivalry with Tulsa Athletic in Tulsa, Oklahoma.

 Record: 1-0-5 [W-D-L]; 7 GF-18 GA

Media coverage
The goal of the club according to is to "provide a serious, professionally run team by the community, for the community." The club has gained notoriety by being the covered by various media outlets such as The UPSL Podcast, the Scissortail Podcast, the Tornado Alley Soccer Podcast, and the Full 90+ Podcast. The first year of the Imps being in the NPSL, they gained large notoriety from coverage from an expert in American Lower League Soccer, Protagonist Soccer.

Year-by-year

Yearly results

All-Time table

Updated as of July 16, 2022

Head coaches 
 Includes all competitive matches: regular season and playoffs

Honors

Club 
 UPSL Spring Central Conference 
 Playoff Champions (1): 2019

Player honors

Records 

 Biggest win: 8–0 v Keene FC, July 7, 2018; 9–1 v Dallas City FC, June 12, 2021
 Biggest defeat: 5–1 v Irving FC, April 27, 2019; 5–1 v Tulsa Athletic, July 6, 2022; 5–1 v Tulsa Athletic, July 16, 2022
 First goal: Petar Durdevic v Inocentes FC, May 19, 2018
 100th goal: Jackson Kim v Dallas City FC, June 12, 2021

References 

Soccer clubs in Oklahoma
Soccer clubs in Oklahoma City
National Premier Soccer League teams
Sports in Oklahoma City
Association football clubs established in 2017
2017 establishments in Oklahoma